Discotronic is the name of the Austrian Dance & Hands-Up project of two Vienna producers, Thomas Greisl and Steve Twain (Stephan Deutsch).

History 

The producer duo of Thomas Greisl and Steve Twain (Stephan Deutsch) founded the dance project Discotronic in 2006. The first single, "Tricky Disco", developed into a European club hit. In Germany, the single charted in the top 5 of the dance charts. Discotronic followed up with two more singles, "World of Discotronic / Now is the Time" and "The Master Plan."

Discotronic is under contract to the Hamburg record label, Mental Madness Records, which the German DJ and producer Dennis Bohn of Brooklyn bounce founded and is among the most successful labels of the genre.

Discotronic remixes many successful artists in the dance scene. They have already remixed tracks for DJ Manian, Cascada, Brooklyn Bounce, Rob Mayth & Dan Winter, Yanou, Basshunter, and many others.

Singles 

I Surrender (Mental Madness Records)
Shooting Star (Mental Madness Records)
The Master Plan (Mental Madness Records)
Tricky Disco (Mental Madness Records)
Tricky Disco - UK Edition (All Around The World)
World of Discotronic / Now is the Time (Mental Madness Records)

Remixes 

Alex Megane - Hurricane 09 (Discotronic Remix) - Yawa Recordings
Andrew Spencer - Video Killed The Radio Star (Discotronic Remix) - Mental Madness
Basshunter - Please Don't Go (Discotronic Remix) - Warner / MoS UK / Balloon Records
Brooklyn Bounce - Get Ready To Bounce (Discotronic Remix) - Mental Madness Records
Dan Winter & Mayth - Dare Me (Discotronic Remix) - Zooland Records
DJ Lawless - Sex Toys (Discotronic Remix) - Mental Madness Records
DJ Manian - Welcome to the Club (Discotronic Remix) - Zooland Records
DJ Roxx - Jumping & Pumping (Discotronic Remix) - Mental Madness Records
Escape One - Upside Down (Discotronic Remix) - Balloon Records
Global Players - Daydream (Discotronic Remix) - Klubbstyle Records
Kevin Stomper - L.I.S.I (Discotronic Remix) - Klubbstyle Records
Manian feat Aila - Heaven (Discotronic Remix) - Zeitgeist
Manox - Supermodel Girlfriend (Discotronic Remix) - Zooland Records
Rebecca J. - I Need You To Be Here (Discotronic Remix) - Be52
Silverstation - Sunshine After The Rain (Discotronic Remix) - Klubbstyle Records
Stee Wee Bee - A Star (Discotronic Remix) - Mental Madness Records
The Boyscouts - Pussy Gain (Discotronic Remix) Trak Music
Ultraflirt - Heaven Is A Place On Earth (Discotronic Remix) - Mental Madness Records
Yanou feat Mark Daviz - A Girl Like You (Discotronic Remix) - Zooland Records

See also
 http://www.myspace.com/discotronic
 http://www.myspace.com/stevetwain
 https://web.archive.org/web/20170116001234/http://www.silverstation.net/

Austrian pop music groups